Eucalyptus gittinsii, commonly known as northern sandplain mallee, is a species of mallee that is endemic to Western Australia. It has smooth greyish bark, sometimes with rough flaky bark near the base, lance-shaped to curved adult leaves, flower buds in groups of three, whitish flowers and cylindrical to barrel-shaped fruit.

Description
It has smooth brownish to white bark, sometimes with rough, flaky bark that peels off near the base of the trunk. Flowering occurs between December and February and the flowers are white or whitish.

Taxonomy and naming
Eucalyptus gittinsii was first formally described in 1978 by Ian Brooker and Donald Blaxell in the journal Nuytsia from a specimen that Blaxell collected "67 km south of 'Billabong Roadhouse'" in 1975. The specific epithet honours Clifford Halliday Gittins (1904 - 1995) for his assistance to the National Herbarium of New South Wales.

In 2000, Dean Nicolle described two subspecies and the names have been accepted by the Australian Plant Census:
 Eucalyptus gittinsii Brooker & Blaxell gittinsii has glossy green adult leaves;
 Eucalyptus gittinsii subsp. illucida D.Nicolle has dull, light green to bluish-green adult leaves.

Distribution and habitat
The northern sandplain mallee is found along the west coast of Western Australia on sand plains, sand dune and ridges in the Mid West and Wheatbelt regions of Western Australia where it grows in sandy soils often with lateritic gravel. Subspecies gittinsii grows in and near the Kalbarri National Park and subspecies illucida between Three Springs and the Moore River.

Conservation status
Both subspecies of E. gittinsii are classified as "not threatened" by the Western Australian Government Department of Parks and Wildlife.

See also
List of Eucalyptus species

References

Eucalypts of Western Australia
gittinsii
Myrtales of Australia
Plants described in 1978
Mallees (habit)
Taxa named by Ian Brooker